Thales Monteiro (20 February 1925 – 2 April 1993) was a Brazilian basketball player who competed in the 1952 Summer Olympics.

References

1925 births
1993 deaths
Brazilian men's basketball players
1954 FIBA World Championship players
Olympic basketball players of Brazil
Basketball players at the 1951 Pan American Games
Basketball players at the 1952 Summer Olympics
Pan American Games medalists in basketball
Pan American Games bronze medalists for Brazil
Medalists at the 1951 Pan American Games
1950 FIBA World Championship players